Redruth Central is an electoral division of Cornwall in the United Kingdom and returns one member to sit on Cornwall Council. The current Councillor is Barbara Ellenbrook, a Conservative.

Extent
The division covers the centre of Redruth as well as Mount Ambrose and the village of Treskerby.

Election results

2017 election

2013 election

2009 election

References

Electoral divisions of Cornwall Council
Redruth